Zunyi Xinzhou Airport  is a dual-use military and civil airport serving the city of Zunyi in China's southwestern Guizhou Province.  It is located in the town of Xinzhou in Xinpu New Area.  The military air base was built in 1966 and completed in 1970.

In September 2009 construction was started to convert the air base to a dual-use airport, with an estimated total investment of 408 million yuan.  The airport opened on 28 August 2012, with inaugural flights to Beijing and Guangzhou.

Facilities
The airport has a 2,800-meter runway (class 4C) and an 11,000 square meter terminal building that is designed to resemble the site of Zunyi Conference.  It is projected to handle 300,000 passengers annually by 2020, although during its first year in operation the airport has already handled 309,531.

Airlines and destinations

See also
List of airports in China
List of the busiest airports in China
List of People's Liberation Army Air Force airbases

References

Airports in Guizhou
Chinese Air Force bases
Airports established in 1970
1970 establishments in China
Airports established in 2012
2012 establishments in China
Zunyi